Nedungadu is a legislative assembly constituency in the Union territory of Puducherry in India. Nedungadu assembly constituency was part of Puducherry (Lok Sabha constituency). This assembly constituency is reserved for SC candidates from 1974.

Members of Legislative Assembly
Sitting and previous MLAs from Nedungadu Assembly Constituency are:

Election results

2021

See also
 List of constituencies of the Puducherry Legislative Assembly
 Karaikal district

References 

Assembly constituencies of Puducherry